Miss Andretti was the 2007 Australian Champion Racehorse of the Year and is the only Thoroughbred in racing history to simultaneously hold a total of five track records in Australia and England.

Breeding
She is a bay or brown mare that was foaled on 12 August 2001 in Western Australia. Miss Andretti was by Ihtiram (IRE) (he had 58 starts for 9 wins, 10 seconds, 5 thirds and $257,379) from Peggie’s Bid by the imported Sydney Cup winner Marooned (GB). Peggie’s Bid has produced seven named foals, but her only other stakes-winner was Danny Beau, by Zedrich who has had 14 starts for 9 wins, 1 second and $436,075. In 2010 Peggie's Bid foaled an unnamed bay or brown half sister to Miss Andretti by the Australian sire, Oratorio.

Racing career
David Mueller selected Miss Andretti from a group of seven weanlings at Ray Cochrane's property.
Miss Andretti was originally trained in Western Australia (WA) by David Mueller who had her win nine races in WA, including the G2 WATC Winterbottom Stakes,  WATC Prince of Wales Stakes and the WATC Ruabon Stakes, while under his care. Mueller, sold a 75 per cent share in Miss Andretti to Melbourne businessman, Sean Buckley and partner Gabriella Guenzi before she was transferred to trainer Lee Freedman. Her former trainer still continued attending her races, including the trip to England, and collected a percentage of prize money. In Melbourne she won in top company in 10 of her first 13 starts for trainer Lee Freedman.

Amongst her major wins are the following G1 races: 
2006 Manikato Stakes and Age Classic
2007 VRC Lightning Stakes, VRC Newmarket Handicap and MVRC Australia Stakes

Miss Andretti’s other group wins were the 2006 G2 MRC Schillaci Stakes over 1,000 metres, G3 MVRC Ian McEwen Trophy and 2007 G2 Schweppes Stakes over 1,200 m.

On 30 May 2007 Miss Andretti travelled to the United Kingdom winning, and smashing the course record in the 2007 King's Stand Stakes during the Royal Ascot meeting. The winner of the previous year, an Australian horse, Takeover Target finished fourth. After this record win American and European syndicates made offers of up to $10 million for Miss Andretti, but they were rejected.

On 26 Nov 2007 Miss Andretti was taken to Hong Kong after spending two weeks in quarantine in Melbourne, before departure. She started in the G1 Hong Kong International Sprint, which is run in a clockwise direction (the reverse of Melbourne racing), but could only finish tenth. After three weeks in Hong Kong Miss Andretti returned to Australia served another three weeks' quarantine in Melbourne. Freedman believed that future racing plans for Miss Andretti in the first half of 2008 were all but ruined by the quarantine protocols she served as part of racing in Hong Kong.

Miss Andretti was retired from racing on 30 August 2008 after finishing last in a listed race at Caulfield Racecourse.

Race record

Stud record
At stud Miss Andretti initially missed (failed to conceive) to matings with Redoute's Choice and Fastnet Rock.  On 1 September 2009 she foaled a chestnut colt by Exceed And Excel at Toolooganvale Stud in the Hunter Region. This colt by Exceed And Excel, was sold at the Gold Coast auction for $460,000 to her trainer Lee Freedman. Owner Sean Buckley took back part-ownership of the foal with hall of fame trainer Lee Freedman. The foal named Mr Villineuve, did not reach the race track.

In 2010 she was in foal to Fastnet Rock.

Honours
Miss Andretti was awarded the title of Australia’s champion racehorse in 2007 as well as the Williams Inglis & Son Champion Sprinter and the Sky Channel Most Popular Racehorse. She has been nominated for inclusion in the West Australian 2010 Racing Industry Hall Of Fame, to be decided later this year.

A book on Miss Andretti's career was published in 2011. Princess: The Miss Andretti Story was written by former West Australian Trotting Association commentator John Hunt and published by Random House Books.

Pedigree

References

2001 racehorse births
Thoroughbred family 8-i
Racehorses bred in Australia
Racehorses trained in Australia
Australian Champion Racehorse of the Year